Kunyu may refer to:

 Mount Kunyu, Shandong, China
 Kunyu, Xinjiang, China